Concord Square is a shopping centre in Tsuen Wan, New Territories, Hong Kong. Formerly the old buildings and villages in Tai Uk Wai, The Blue Yard (built in 2002) and the shopping centre were portions of Tsuen Wan Seven Street Redevelopment Project. It was completed in 2003 and developed by Concord Land Development Company Limited. A Wellcome supermarket is at its basement.

References

Shopping malls established in 2003
Tsuen Wan
Tsuen Wan District
Shopping centres in Hong Kong